Dos Tiempos Bajo Un Mismo Tono is a rap album released by Puerto Rican singer Vico C and Jossie Esteban on 1990 in Puerto Rico by Prime Records and BMG on 1990 and on January 18, 1994 by RCA records in the United States.It is a compilation of six Vico`s C previous hits and two new songs. In the first song titled "Blanca", appear Jossie Esteban y la Patrulla 15, being a great hit in Latin America. Also, they appear in the song "Que Cante La Esperanza".

Track listing

References

1994 albums
Vico C albums